V385 Andromedae is a variable star in the constellation Andromeda, about  away.  It is a red giant over a hundred times larger than the sun.  It has an apparent magnitude around 6.4, just about visible to the naked eye in ideal conditions.

V385 Andromedae was identified as a long-period variable in 1999 from analysis of Hipparcos photometry.  It was classified as a slow irregular variable, but analysis of its light curve identified a possible 36 day period.  It varies by about 0.1 magnitudes.

References

External links
 MASCARA page

Andromeda (constellation)
220524
Andromedae, V385
M-type giants
115530
Durchmusterung objects
Slow irregular variables